Everybody Glows is an album by Kaki King, released on November 4, 2014.  It features a collection of outtakes, demos, covers, live versions and tracks from demo CDs. The collection reveals the evolution of her songwriting while offering a glimpse of a young guitarist doing daring things on her instrument. The album comes with a track-by-track explanation of each song, along with liner notes written by her father. This is the first album Kaki released on her own label, Short Stuff Records.

Track listing
All songs written by Kaki King except "Anthem for the Earnest" (written by David King), "Close to Me" (written by Robert Smith) and "Lovestoned" (written by Justin Timberlake, Tim Mosley and Nate "Danja" Hills).

References
 Everybody Glows: B-Sides & Rarities at Bandcamp

Kaki King albums